The Missouri Traveler is a 1958 American coming-of-age period piece drama film directed by Jerry Hopper starring Brandon deWilde and Lee Marvin. It is based on the novel of the same name by John Burress. The cinematography was by Technicolor developer Winton C. Hoch with harmonica and banjo score by Jack Marshall of The Munsters fame. The feature was distributed by the Buena Vista Corporation subsidiary of Walt Disney Productions, but the film did not carry the "Disney" trademark.

It is the second of only 3 films produced by Cornelius Vanderbilt Whitney's C. V. Whitney Pictures; the first being The Searchers in 1956 with John Wayne and directed by John Ford, the last being The Young Land in 1959 with Patrick Wayne and Dennis Hopper.

Whitney married Mary Hosford, whom he gave a prominent part in this film, the same year it was released. The following year, in 1959,  deWilde's career would graduate to more adult themes in Blue Denim.

Plot
 

Brandon deWilde leads a cast lengthy in character actors playing subdued Biarn Turner, a 15-year-old runaway from the Eatondale Orphan Asylum bound for Florida in the post-World War I time period of 1926. He receives a ride into the rural Missouri town of Delphi with rich land-owner Tobias Brown (Lee Marvin). There, after an episode in the town square involving most of the populace, he meets crusty newspaper man Doyle Magee (Gary Merrill).

Both of these men share an interest in the polite and mature youth; one showing kindness, the other almost outright cruelty. Eventually, both of their reasonings become clear to the lad. At the same time, the whole town of Delphi comes to not only accept Biarn, but to embrace him as one of the town's own and his dream of becoming a farmer.

Highlights include a small-town 4th of July parade and celebration with a horse-trotting race and a head-to-head between Magee and Brown.

The book version of this story, upon which the film was based, has a more complex story line than was able to be incorporated into the film version. In the book, Biarn has a significant impact on the lives of several of the townspeople without his consciously trying to affect them. This is missing from the film version, which comes across more like a family Disney type film. Unfortunately, while it is a better version of the story, the book "The Missouri Traveler" is very difficult to find.

Cast
 Brandon deWilde as Biarn Turner
 Lee Marvin as Tobias Brown
 Gary Merrill as Doyle Magee
 Paul Ford as Finas Daugherty
 Mary Hosford as Anna Love Price
 Ken Curtis as Fred Mueller
 Cal Tinney as Clyde Hamilton Baker
 Frank Cady as Willie Poole
 Mary Field as Nelda Hamilton
 Kathleen Freeman as Serena Poole
 Will Wright as Sheriff Peavy
 Tom Tiner as Reverend Thomdyke
 Bill Bryant as Henry Craig
 Barry Curtis as Jimmy Price
 Eddie Little as "Red" Poole
 Roy Jenson as Simpson

Home media
No less than six different releases of The Missouri Traveler were produced on VHS. Similarly, multiple DVD versions were released over the years, mainly as an inclusion in a multiple film "family pack". Presently, The Missouri Traveler is available in Region 0 DVD through Reel Enterprises and video on demand in standard pan and scan VHS conversion format. A new DVD of the film was released on April 14, 2015, from VCI Entertainment (VCIV8793DVD).

See also
 List of American films of 1958

References

External links
 
 
 The Missouri Traveler at RememberingBrandon.net

1958 films
1950s coming-of-age drama films
1958 drama films
American coming-of-age drama films
Films about horses
Films about orphans
Films directed by Jerry Hopper
Films scored by Jack Marshall
1950s English-language films
1950s American films